Stanley County may refer to:

 Stanley County, South Dakota, United States
 County of Stanley (South Australia), Australia

See also
 Stanley (disambiguation)#Places
 Stanly County, North Carolina, United States

County name disambiguation pages